J. Mark Butler (born July 21, 1970) is an American politician who served as the Georgia Labor Commissioner. He became the first Republican to hold the office with his election in 2010, in which Republicans won every statewide office in Georgia.
Prior to serving as Commissioner of Labor, Butler served in the Georgia House of Representatives. He was re-elected Labor Commissioner in 2014 and 2018. His term expired in January 2023.

References

1970 births
21st-century American politicians
Auburn University alumni
Living people
Republican Party members of the Georgia House of Representatives
People from Carrollton, Georgia
State labor commissioners in the United States